David Joel John "Dave" Pulkkinen (born May 18, 1949) is a Canadian former professional ice hockey player who played two games in the National Hockey League with the New York Islanders during the 1972–73 season. The rest of his career, which lasted from 1969 to 1975, was spent in various minor leagues.

Career statistics

Regular season and playoffs

References 
 

1949 births
Living people
Baltimore Clippers players
Canadian ice hockey centres
Dayton Gems players
Kansas City Blues players
New Haven Nighthawks players
New York Islanders players
Oshawa Generals players
People from Kapuskasing
Port Huron Flags players
St. Louis Blues draft picks
Syracuse Eagles players